Sérgio Luiz Pereira (born July 15, 1960), stagename Sergio Kato, is a Brazilian-American actor, television host, comedian and former martial artist. He found greater fame in his hometown of Rio de Janeiro, after a stage play at the Scala Rio music venue. Since then, Kato have been working for a number of advertising campaigns, TV shows and films.  Former model and active actor 2019. 
Aside from the acting career, Kato still modeling not as much. Print-adds, campaigns and TV Commercials for grief clothing.

Sergio is brother of former footballer and current football coach Mazarópi.

Career

Early work 
He began his acting career at Teatro O Tablado in Rio de Janeiro, where he studied and worked. Still in Rio de Janeiro, he gained notoriety acting, dancing and singing in spectacles of Scala Rio.

Still young, in 1982 he served the Brazilian Air Force, than in 1985 he moved to the United States. After studying English at California High School, He studied at the University of California in Los Angeles, Where he received a Diploma from the UCLA School of Theater, Film and Television. In similar fashion, the movie  industry changes rapidly, many projects in Europe and the USA.

Cinema and TV career 
Kato' first TV appearance came in 1976, his first film was Bete Balanço, in 1984, where he played a dancer. He wanted to move from a ballet dancer to acting, finally achieving it when he was chosen to play the role of a cab driver in the Brenda Starr film with Brooke Shields. Later he played a bartender together with Tracey Birdsall-Smith, on the film I Might Even Love You.

In January 1993, just weeks after leaving back to California from Japan, Kato was reading several new scripts for future films, one of them being the Only the Strong, an action drama film with Mark Dacascos, written and directed by Sheldon Lettich.

In 1997, Kato did a cameo role on Rede Globo's soap opera A Indomada playing the character Arnold together with the actor José de Abreu.

Modelling 
Sergio Kato signed with modeling agency in New York City, appeared in ads for Calvin Klein with Dylan Bruno and modeled in Paris, Japan and Milan. His modeling career also includes modeling for Polo Ralph Lauren, Georgio Armani, Dolce & Gabbana, Timex etc.

Filmography

Television

Film

References

External links 

 
 
 Interview with Sergio Kato

1960 births
Living people
20th-century Brazilian male actors
21st-century Brazilian male actors
People from Minas Gerais
Male actors from Rio de Janeiro (city)
Brazilian male television actors
Brazilian male models
Brazilian emigrants to the United States
American male television actors
American male models
Male actors from California